The Paper Man is a 1963 Mexican drama film directed by Ismael Rodríguez. The film was selected as the Mexican entry for the Best Foreign Language Film at the 36th Academy Awards, but was not accepted as a nominee.

Plot
A homeless deaf mute man named Adán is a waste picker who one day stumbles upon 10,000 pesos. As he marvels in his new fortune he meets many characters who now accept him trying to get their part of the money. Eventually Adán buys a puppet named Titino from an unscrupulous ventriloquist, thinking he will have a companion with whom to talk. When the obvious dawns on him Adán angrily breaks the puppet. Eventually he resigns to take care of some puppies and to decide to do some change to the world.

Cast
 Ignacio López Tarso as Adán
 Alida Valli as La Italiana
 Susana Cabrera as La Gorda
 Guillermo Orea as Tendero
 Alicia del Lago as María
 José Ángel Espinoza as Torcuato (as Ferrusquilla)
 Famie Kaufman as Prostituta (as 'Vitola')
 Mario García 'Harapos' as El Gorgojo (as Harapos)
 Dolores Camarillo
 Raúl Castell as Don Trini
 Tizoc Rodríguez
 Jana Kleinburg
 Carlos Ancira as Comisario

Awards
Ignacio López Tarso won the Golden Gate Award for Best Actor at the San Francisco International Film Festival, and Alida Valli was nominated for the Best Motion Picture Actress at the Golden Globes.

See also
 List of submissions to the 36th Academy Awards for Best Foreign Language Film
 List of Mexican submissions for the Academy Award for Best Foreign Language Film

References

External links
 

1963 films
1963 drama films
1960s Spanish-language films
Mexican black-and-white films
Films directed by Ismael Rodríguez
1960s Mexican films